Joachim Gnilka (8 December 1928 in Leobschütz/Silesia – 15 January 2018 in Munich) was a German Roman Catholic theologian, New Testament scholar, exegete, and professor.

Biography
Gnilka studied Catholic theology, Christian philosophy, and Oriental languages in Eichstätt, Würzburg, and Rome from 1947 to 1953.
From 1953 to 1956 he served as chaplain in Würzburg. In 1955, Gnilka earned a Doctorate of Theology (Th.D.). In 1959, he earned a habilitation, and from 1959 to 1962 was Privatdozent (associate professor, senior lecturer) at the University of Würzburg. From 1962 to 1975, he was professor of New Testament at the University of Münster. From 1975 to 1997, he was professor at the Ludwig Maximilian University of Munich. From 1973 to 1988, Gnilka was a member of the Pontifical Biblical Commission, and from 1986 to 1997 a member of the International Theological Commission.

His commentary on the Gospel of Matthew was extensively quoted by Pope Benedict XVI in his 2007 book Jesus of Nazareth: From the Baptism in the Jordan to the Transfiguration.

Bibliography
 
 
 
 
 
 
 
 
 
 
  (3 Bde.)

References

Sources
 Joachim Gnilka on the Homepage of Westfälischen Wilhelms-University Münster
 Joachim Gnilka on the Homepage of Ludwig-Maximilians-University Munich

1928 births
2018 deaths
20th-century German Catholic theologians
21st-century German Catholic theologians
Bible commentators
Catholic University of Eichstätt-Ingolstadt
German biblical scholars
German male non-fiction writers
International Theological Commission
Academic staff of the Ludwig Maximilian University of Munich
New Testament scholars
People from Głubczyce
People from the Province of Silesia
Pontifical Biblical Commission
Roman Catholic biblical scholars
Sapienza University of Rome alumni
Systematic theologians
Academic staff of the University of Münster
University of Würzburg alumni
Academic staff of the University of Würzburg